The 1901 Wesleyan Methodists football team was an American football team that represented Wesleyan University as a member of the Triangular Football League (TFL) during the 1901 college football season. In its third season under head coach Robert P. Wilson, the team compiled a 3–6–1 record and was outscored by a total of 102 to 45. The team played its home games at Andrus Field in Middletown, Connecticut.

Schedule

References

Wesleyan
Wesleyan Cardinals football seasons
Wesleyan Methodists football